Impulse is an album by saxophonist Buck Hill which was recorded in 1992 and released on the Muse label.

Reception

The AllMusic review by Scott Yanow stated "the veteran tenor saxophonist is heard in peak form. This particularly well-rounded set has many high points".

Track listing
All compositions by Buck Hill except where noted
 "Blues in the Closet" (Oscar Pettiford) – 5:31
 "You Taught My Heart to Sing" (McCoy Tyner, Sammy Cahn) – 4:22
 "Random Walk" – 4:57
 "Impulse" – 6:14
 "In a Sentimental Mood" (Duke Ellington, Manny Kurtz, Irving Mills) – 6:28
 "Sweet Georgia Brown" (Ben Bernie, Maceo Pinkard, Kenneth Casey) – 6:03	
 "Solitude" (Ellington, Eddie DeLange, Mills) – 5:57
 "Ottowa Bash" – 6:28
 "How Do You Keep the Music Playing?" (Michel Legrand, Alan Bergman, Marilyn Bergman) – 4:08
 "Now's the Time" (Charlie Parker) – 4:30

Personnel
Buck Hill – tenor saxophone, clarinet
Jon Ozment – piano 
Carroll V. Dashiell, Jr. – bass 
Warren Shadd – drums

References

Muse Records albums
Buck Hill (musician) albums
1995 albums
Albums recorded at Van Gelder Studio